Fishbowl (formerly ExpressTech Holdings) is an Orem, Utah-based software company that develops and publishes inventory management software and related software.

History
Fishbowl was formed in 2001 by Chuck and Beverly Hale, two business owners in Salt Lake City. The pair invested $3 million into the software company and went through several CEOs in rapid succession.

In 2015, Fishbowl was named to a list of companies for employee financial security. Fishbowl has also earned a number of business awards for its revenue growth from organizations such as Inc. 5000, Deloitte, MountainWest Capital, and Global Red Herring.

In December 2021, Fishbowl was acquired by Diversis Capital Management, LP, a Los Angeles-based private equity firm focused on investing in software and technology-enabled services organizations.

Products
The company's flagship product, formerly called Fishbowl Inventory, is inventory management software that integrates with QuickBooks. It separated into three products, Fishbowl Manufacturing,  Fishbowl Warehouse, and Boxstorm, which is a SaaS product. As of 2009, Fishbowl has been the top-selling manufacturing and warehouse management product for QuickBooks since 2003.

In addition, Fishbowl Manufacturing, Fishbowl Warehouse, and Boxstorm claim to integrate with QuickBooks Online and other technology.

Boxstorm is a cloud-based inventory management software and mobile app created in 2017 by Fishbowl. Boxstorm is intended for small businesses.

The free version of Boxstorm is called Boxstorm Forever Free. Fishbowl claims it is the first no-cost online inventory management software to integrate with QuickBooks Online. It can be used to scan barcodes, add inventory, perform cycle counts, assign units of measure, and create locations to store inventory.

There are three paid versions of Boxstorm that include other features, such as sales orders, purchase orders, vendors, taxes, stock alerts, and user permissions.

References

Software companies based in Utah
2001 establishments in Utah
Companies based in Orem, Utah
Software companies of the United States